José Arnaldo Cañete Prieto (born 19 March 1996) is a Paraguayan footballer who plays as a defender for Olimpia.

References

External links

José Cañete at EuroSport
José Cañete at Franjeado 
José Cañete at Football Database

1996 births
Living people
Paraguayan footballers
Paraguayan expatriate footballers
Paraguay international footballers
Paraguayan Primera División players
Club Olimpia footballers
Independiente F.B.C. footballers
Deportivo Capiatá players
Club Atlético 3 de Febrero players
Deportivo Santaní players
Sportivo Luqueño players
Association football defenders